Det kommer mera was a television entertainment programme, which aired over SVT between 11 September 1993 – 20 April 1996.

Programme hosts were Arne Hegerfors and Martin Timell. Martin Timell was later replaced with Anders Lundin.

References

External links
The programme at SVT's open archive 

Sveriges Television original programming